Chrysoscota vagivitta is a moth of the family Erebidae. It was described by Francis Walker in 1866. It is found on Misool, Seram and New Guinea.

References

Lithosiina
Moths described in 1866